Gerrard is a census-designated place (CDP) in and governed by Rio Grande County, Colorado, United States. The population of the Gerrard CDP was 264 at the 2020 United States Census. The South Fork post office  serves the area.

Geography

Demographics

See also

 List of census-designated places in Colorado

References

External links

 Gerrard, Colorado Mining Claims And Mines
 Rio Grande County website

Census-designated places in Rio Grande County, Colorado
Census-designated places in Colorado